Welborn Griffin Dolvin Sr. (February 8, 1916 – May 17, 1991) was a lieutenant general in the United States Army. He was a veteran of World War II, the Korean War and the Vietnam War. He is the recipient of Distinguished Service Cross and four Silver Stars. He served as commander of the XXIV Corps from 1971 to 1972. Dolvin is one of the 50 most top decorated American veterans.

Dolvin was married to Cynthia Kent Burress, the daughter of Lieutenant General Withers A. Burress, in 1949. They had three children and four grandchildren.

Dolvin died on May 17, 1991, due to cardiac arrhythmia related to asthma. He was buried at Arlington National Cemetery.

Promotions

Awards and decorations
His decorations include:

References

1916 births
1991 deaths
United States Military Academy alumni
United States Army generals
Recipients of the Distinguished Service Cross (United States)
Recipients of the Distinguished Service Medal (US Army)
Recipients of the Silver Star
Recipients of the Legion of Merit
Recipients of the Order of Merit of the Federal Republic of Germany
Burials at Arlington National Cemetery
Recipients of the Air Medal
People from Greene County, Georgia
Military personnel from Georgia (U.S. state)
Recipients of the Croix de Guerre 1939–1945 (France)
Recipients of the National Order of Vietnam
United States Army personnel of World War II
United States Army personnel of the Korean War
United States Army personnel of the Vietnam War